On a Mission may refer to:

On a Mission (Buck-O-Nine album), 2001
On a Mission (Katy B album), 2011
On a Mission (Trick Pony album), 2002
"On a Mission" (Trick Pony song)
"On a Mission" (Gabriella Cilmi song), 2010
On a Mission, an album by G-Ism featuring Cool Nutz, 1998
 "On a Mission", a song by Mumzy Stranger, 2010